Helen Margaret Sharpe (23 February 1927 – 7 December 1996) was an English cricketer who played as a batter and occasional wicket-keeper. She appeared in five Test matches for England between 1957 and 1961, and captained them on their tour of South Africa in 1960/61. She played domestic cricket for Yorkshire and Middlesex.

References

External links
 
 

1937 births
1996 deaths
Cricketers from Huddersfield
England women Test cricketers
Yorkshire women cricketers
Middlesex women cricketers